Selenops insularis is a species of flatty in the spider family Selenopidae. It is found in the United States and Greater Antilles.

References

Further reading

External links

 

Selenopidae
Articles created by Qbugbot
Spiders described in 1881